Ctenucha projecta is a moth of the family Erebidae. It was described by Paul Dognin in 1904. It is found in Paraguay and Peru.

References

projecta
Moths described in 1904